Ski jumping at the 1964 Winter Olympics consisted of two events held from 31 January to 9 February, with the large hill event taking place at Bergiselschanze, and the normal hill event at Seefeld. For the first time at the olympics, more than one ski jumping event was contested, with the addition of a large hill competition.

Medal summary

Medal table

Norway led the medal table with four, one gold. Since this was the first Olympics with more than one ski jumping event, the four ski jumping medals were the highest for any nation in Olympic history to that point.

Events

Participating NOCs
Fifteen nations participated in ski jumping at the Innsbruck Games.

References

 
1964 Winter Olympics events
1964
1964 in ski jumping